"Love in the Dark" is a song by English singer and songwriter Adele from her third studio album, 25 (2015). The song was written by Adele Adkins and Samuel Dixon. It charted at number 39, 79, 65, 52 and 76 on France, Germany, Netherlands, Sweden and in the UK Singles Chart, respectively as well as charting at number 54 on the Global 200, primarily following the release of her recent single "Easy on Me" in 2021.

Composition
"Love in the Dark" is a torch ballad song which is written in the key of A minor and it is composed in common time ( time).

Meaning
"Love in the Dark" is a slow, sad, beautiful song from Adele, and it's likely based on a lot of what 21 was based on. Adele has said that 25 is a make-up album, as opposed to 21 which was a break-up album. However, in this song, Adele does reach back for a little of what made her famous and executes it skillfully in this song.

Credits and personnel

 Adele – vocals, songwriting, writing
 Samuel Dixon – piano and synthesizer, producer and engineer, songwriting, writing
 FILMharmonic Orchestra – strings
 Adam Klemens – conductor
 Oliver Kraus – string arrangement
 Petr Pycha – orchestra contractor
 Tom Coyne – mastering
 Cameron Craig – engineer
 Tom Elmhirst – mixing
 Jan Holzner – engineer
 Randy Merrill – mastering

Charts

Certifications

References

2015 songs
Adele songs
Songs written by Adele